Hronsek is a village and municipality of the Banská Bystrica District in the Banská Bystrica Region of Slovakia.

History

In historical records, the village was first mentioned in 1500, and it has changed its name many times during its History: (1500 Zyklafalu, 1506 Czwiklafalwa, 1514 Galoyczfalwa, 1515 Galowycz, 1522 Czwyklina, 1558 Czwyklina alias Galfalwa, 1565 Garanzk). It belonged to the district of Zvolen. From the 15th century, control of the town passed to the Prokopy family, later to the Soós and in the 17th century to the Géczy families.

Wooden Church
Built in 1725–6, this articular church can hold as many as 1,100 worshippers in an amphitheatre-style arrangement. It is the only wooden church in Slovakia which exhibits Scandinavian architectural influences, for instance in the beam connections and the arrangement of the columns. How these features, which have contributed significantly to the structure's longevity, arrived in Hronsek is still a mystery.

References

External links

e-obce.sk
tourist-channel.sk
hrady.sk
Spectacular Slovakia travelguide- Hronsek: articles of faith (edition 2009) 
Spectacular Slovakia travelguide - Hronsek: Worship in wood (edition 2008)

Villages and municipalities in Banská Bystrica District
Churches in Banská Bystrica Region